Catocala prolifica is a moth in the family Erebidae first described by Francis Walker in 1857. It is found in India.

References

prolifica
Moths described in 1857
Moths of Asia